Charles Norman Shay (born June 27, 1924) is a Penobscot tribal elder, writer, and decorated veteran of both World War II and the Korean War. Along with a Bronze Star and Silver Star, Shay was also awarded the Legion d'Honneur, making him the first Native American in Maine with the distinction of French chevalier. He was instrumental in the re-publishing of a book by his own grandfather, Joseph Nicolar: The Life and Traditions of the Red Man, originally published in 1893. He has recently written an autobiography, Project Omaha Beach: The Life and Military Service of a Penobscot Indian Elder that details his time abroad in the military. Shay is also a direct descendant of Jean-Vincent d'Abbadie de Saint-Castin.

World War II
Shay was drafted into the military in 1943 at the age of 19. He was selected for training as a medical technician and learned basic surgery skills. Shay joined the Medical Detachment of the First Division's (the "Big Red One") 16th Infantry Regiment and was attached as a platoon medic to Fox Company. As a combat medic, Shay treated as many of his wounded comrades as possible – bandaging wounds, applying tourniquets, applying makeshift splints, administering morphine or otherwise trying to make the wounded soldiers as comfortable as possible. Shay pulled several struggling soldiers from the rising tide, saving many immobilized wounded from drowning  during the first wave of the landing of Omaha Beach on D-Day. He was also present helping the fallen at the Battles of Aachen, Huertgen Forest, and the Ardennes (Battle of the Bulge).

Shay was later attached to a reconnaissance squadron moving into the small farming village of Auel near the Sieg River in Germany. The squadron encountered about 20 German soldiers accompanied by a tank with an 88mm weapon, and were forced to surrender. The squadron was then marched 50–60 miles, moving only by night, to the POW camp Stalag VI-G. The column of prisoners grew along the way as the German unit accumulated more and more American soldiers. Shay was interrogated at the camp and held there until April 12, 1945, when American troops encircled the camp, trapping 350,000 enemy soldiers and liberating the camp. Shay was sent home soon after.

Post-World War II and Korea
After making it home safely, Shay was unable to find work, like many other veterans after the war. He re-enlisted and was stationed in Vienna, Austria, serving as a medic with a Military Police Battalion. While stationed there he met a woman named Lilli [Rosa] Bollarth, and they married on March 21, 1950. When the Korean War broke out later that year, Shay joined the 3rd Division's 7th Infantry Regiment as a medic and was shipped to Japan. A few months later, his regiment went into battle in Korea and he served again as a combat medic. Shay was promoted to master sergeant and awarded the Bronze Star with two oak leaf clusters.

Retirement
Charles and his wife Lilli lived together in Vienna, visiting Shay's original hometown on Indian Island in Maine in the summers. Charles and Lilli officially relocated to Indian Island in 2003, but unfortunately Lilli fell ill almost immediately. She died shortly after.

Shay has also renovated the two-story wooden "Teepee" on Native Island that his aunt Lucy Nicolar Poolaw and her Kiowa Indian husband Chief Bruce Poolaw built as a novelty shop and to sell Lucy's handmade baskets. Shay has restored the site as a small Family Museum.

Charles Norman Shay is an elder member of the Penobscot tribe of Maine. Also known as the Penawahpskewi, the people of the Penobscot Nation are federally recognized. The tribe is part of the Wabanaki group, located in Maine, New Brunswick, and Nova Scotia. Shay lives in the community of the Native Americans reservation where he spent his childhood on Penobscot Island, opposite Old Town, Maine. In his retirement, Shay played a big role in the installment of National Native American Veterans Day.

In 2021, Shay was reported to be living in France, as the only veteran to attend the D-Day commemoration.

Project Omaha Beach

In spring of 2007, Shay along with Harald E. L. Prins and his wife Bunny McBride, both of Kansas State University, planned a trip back to Europe so Shay could visit past battle sites and comment on his experiences. The group was awarded grants to fund the journey from both the Maine Humanities Council and the First Division Museum in Wheaton, Illinois.

Prins, McBride, and Shay visited Normandy, Mons, Aachen, Hurtgen Forest, the Ardennes, and Auel. The trip was documented and filmed for future reference and in order to shed light on the experiences of American Indian soldiers in World War II. In Project Omaha Beach: The Life and Military Service of a Penobscot Native American Elder, Shay narrates the journey in the form of letters to his deceased wife Lilli, and also includes an autobiography and information on organizations with which Shay is now associated. The book was published in 2012 by Polar Bear & Company in Solon, Maine. Soon after returning to his home at Panawahpskek (NAtives Island), Maine, Shay was personally inducted into the Legion of Honour as a Chevalier by Nicolas Sarkozy, President of the French Republic at the French Embassy in Washington DC.

A year later, in 2008, Shay was inducted as a Distinguished Member of the 16th Infantry Regiment in a special ceremony at Fort Riley, Kansas, home base of the 1st Infantry Division, the famous "Big Red One." In 2009, he spearheaded the official establishment of June 21 as Native American Veterans Day in Maine, the first state in the US to do so. Eight years later, he was invited to ceremonially inaugurate a large granite turtle sculpture at the "Charles Shay Indian Memorial," a small park in the dunes overlooking Omaha Beach.

Notes

References

Further reading

External links
 
 Charles Norman Shay Collection: Veterans History Project (American Folklife Center, Library of Congress)

1924 births
Living people
Native American people from Maine
Native American writers
Penobscot people
People from Penobscot Indian Island Reservation
People from Bristol, Connecticut
Military personnel from Connecticut
Chevaliers of the Légion d'honneur
United States Army personnel of the Korean War
United States Army personnel of World War II
Recipients of the Silver Star
American prisoners of war in World War II
World War II prisoners of war held by Germany
American expatriates in Austria
Writers from Connecticut
Writers from Maine
Writers from Vienna
United States Army non-commissioned officers
20th-century Native Americans
21st-century Native Americans